The Melfort Mustangs are a junior "A" ice hockey team based in Melfort, Saskatchewan, Canada.  They are members of the Saskatchewan Junior Hockey League (SJHL).  They play their home games at the Northern Lights Palace, which has a seating capacity of 1,850.  The team colors are blue, green, and white.

The Mustangs joined the SJHL for the 1988–89 season. They won SJHL championships in 1992, 1996, 2015 and 2016.

Season-by-season standings

Playoffs
1989 DNQ
1990 DNQ
1991 Lost Quarter-final
Nipawin Hawks defeated Melfort Mustangs 4-games-to-2
1992 Won League, Lost Anavet Cup
Melfort Mustangs defeated Saskatoon Titans 4-games-to-none
Melfort Mustangs defeated Humboldt Broncos 4-games-to-2
Melfort Mustangs defeated Estevan Bruins 4-games-to-1 SJHL CHAMPIONS
Winkler Flyers (MJHL) defeated Melfort Mustangs 4-games-to-1
1993 Lost Quarter-final
Nipawin Hawks defeated Melfort Mustangs 4-games-to-2
1994 Lost Final
Melfort Mustangs defeated Nipawin Hawks 4-games-to-3
Melfort Mustangs defeated Humboldt Broncos 4-games-to-none
Weyburn Red Wings defeated Melfort Mustangs 4-games-to-2
1995 Lost Semi-final
Melfort Mustangs defeated Nipawin Hawks 4-games-to-2
Battlefords North Stars defeated Melfort Mustangs 4-games-to-2
1996 Won League, Won Anavet Cup, Won Abbott Cup, Lost 1996 Royal Bank Cup final
Melfort Mustangs defeated Humboldt Broncos 4-games-to-none
Melfort Mustangs defeated Battlefords North Stars 4-games-to-1
Melfort Mustangs defeated Yorkton Terriers 4-games-to-1 SJHL CHAMPIONS
Melfort Mustangs defeated St. James Canadians (MJHL) 4-games-to-none ANAVET CUP CHAMPIONS
First in 1996 Royal Bank Cup round robin (4-0) ABBOTT CUP CHAMPIONS
Melfort Mustangs defeated Newmarket 87's (OPJHL) 7-4 in semi-final
Vernon Lakers (BCHL) defeated Melfort Mustangs 2-0 in final
1997 Lost Quarter-final
Battlefords North Stars defeated Melfort Mustangs 4-games-to-none
1998 Lost Quarter-final
Kindersley Klippers defeated Melfort Mustangs 4-games-to-none
1999 Lost Semi-final
Melfort Mustangs defeated Battlefords North Stars 4-games-to-2
Humboldt Broncos defeated Melfort Mustangs 4-games-to-none
2000 Lost Preliminary round robin
Third in round robin (1-3) vs. Battlefords North Stars and Flin Flon Bombers
2001 DNQ
2002 Lost Semi-final
Melfort Mustangs defeated Nipawin Hawks 4-games-to-3
Kindersley Klippers defeated Melfort Mustangs 4-games-to-1
2003 Lost Quarter-final
Humboldt Broncos defeated Melfort Mustangs 4-games-to-none
2004 DNQ
2005 Lost Quarter-final
Melfort Mustangs defeated Nipawin Hawks 4-games-to-2
La Ronge Ice Wolves defeated Melfort Mustangs 4-games-to-2
2006 Lost Preliminary
Flin Flon Bombers defeated Melfort Mustangs 4-games-to-3
2007 Lost Quarter-final
Third in round robin (1-3) vs. Humboldt Broncos and Battlefords North Stars
Humboldt Broncos defeated Melfort Mustangs 4-games-to-3
2008 Lost Quarter-final
Second in round robin (1-2) vs. Humboldt Broncos and Flin Flon Bombers
Flin Flon Bombers defeated Melfort Mustangs 4-games-to-2
2009 Lost Quarter-final
Flin Flon Bombers defeated Melfort Mustangs 4-games-to-none
2010 Lost Quarter-final
Battlefords North Stars defeated Melfort Mustangs 4-games-to-1
2011 Lost Semi-final
Melfort Mustangs defeated Humboldt Broncos 4-games-to-2
Yorkton Terriers defeated Melfort Mustangs 4-games-to-1

Western Canada Cup
Western Canada Championships ** BCHL - AJHL- SJHL - MJHL - Host  **
Round robin play with 1st vs 2nd - winner advance to National Championship & loser to Runner Up Game3rd vs 4th in 2nd semi-final winner to Runner Up game loser eliminated. Runner Up game determines 2nd representative to National Championship.Competition began 2013 season.

Royal Bank Cup
CANADIAN NATIONAL CHAMPIONSHIPS
(Dudley Hewitt Champion - Central Zone) & (Fred Page Champion - Eastern Zone) & (Western Canada Cup - Western Zone) & (Western Canada Cup - Runner Up) & (Host)
Round robin play with top 4 in semi-final and winners to finals.

-* Lost Runner Up game at Western Canada Cup to Portage. Portage is host so Melfort still advances to RBC as runner up representative

Retired numbers

NHL alumni
Parris Duffus -  Phoenix Coyotes
Michel Larocque - Chicago Blackhawks
Scott Fankhouser - Atlanta Thrashers
Willie Mitchell - Los Angeles Kings
Ruslan Fedotenko - New York Rangers
Marc Habscheid - Edmonton Oilers
Derek Boogaard - Minnesota Wild

See also
 List of ice hockey teams in Saskatchewan

External links
Melfort Mustangs official website

Saskatchewan Junior Hockey League teams